Komnenić is a Serbian surname, derived from the name Komnen. It may refer to:

Milan Komnenić, Serbian writer
Boris Komnenić (b. 1957), Serbian actor
Petar Komnenić, Montenegrin journalist
Vaso Komnenić, Serbian athlete

See also
Komnenović, surname
Komnenos, Byzantine dynasty

Serbian surnames